Sir John Niall Henderson Blelloch  (24 October 1930 – 1 August 2017) was a British civil servant who was Permanent Under Secretary of State at the Northern Ireland Office from 1988 to 1990.

Blelloch was educated at Fettes College in Edinburgh and Gonville and Caius College, Cambridge.

He served as a Deputy Secretary in the Northern Ireland Office Office from 1980 to 1982, while resident in Northern Ireland. He held the posts of Deputy Secretary (Policy) and then Second Permanent Under Secretary at the MOD between 1982 and 1988 when he took up his post as Permanent Under Secretary of State at the Northern Ireland Office, an appointment he held until 1990.

From 1998, he was the co-chair of the Northern Ireland Sentence Review Commission, along with Brian Currin. He was Vice-Chairman of The Automobile Association and held a number of other appointments on government committees and with voluntary organisations.

Death
Sir John Blelloch died on 1 August 2017, aged 86.

References

Sources
Blelloch, Sir John (Niall Henderson), Who's Who 2014, A & C Black, 2014; online edn, Oxford University Press, 2014

1930 births
2017 deaths
People educated at Fettes College
Alumni of Gonville and Caius College, Cambridge
Permanent Under-Secretaries of State for Northern Ireland
Second Permanent Under-Secretaries of State for Defence